Banca Transilvania S.A. (also BT or TLV) is a banking institution with headquarters in Cluj-Napoca, Romania. The bank was founded in 1993 in Cluj-Napoca with a capital of 2 billion RON, of which 79% was Romanian and 21% foreign.

BT is the largest bank in Romania in terms of assets, with a market share of over 16%. Its activities are organized into four main business lines: corporate banking, IMM, retail banking and medical division. BT has about 1.76 million customers, 550 locations, and over 7,000 employees. Since June 2013, the CEO of BT has been Ömer Tetik.

General Information
A large Romanian bank, Banca Transilvania has over 1.76 million customers. The European Bank for Reconstruction and Development (EBRD) is the largest shareholder in the bank (15% of capital).

In 2013, Banca Transilvania was considered the third largest bank in Romania, not having experienced losses during a financial crisis plaguing the nation in the year.

In 1997, it became the first bank in Romania to be listed on the Bucharest Stock Exchange It entered Superbrands Romania for the first time in 2013. Furthermore, it also launched the Western Union money transfer service via Internet Banking and ATM.

Bank net profit 

 2007: 102 million euros
 2008: 108.2 million euros
 2009: 14.6 million euros
 2010: 24.43 million euros
 2011: 51.34 million euros
 2012: 71.98 million euros
 2013: 83.44 million euros

Bank assets 

 2006: 1.2 billion euros
 2007: 3.8 billion euros
 2008: 4.2 billion euros
 2009: 4.6 billion euros
 2010: 4.8 million euros
 2011: 5.8 million euros
 2012: 6.6 million euros
 2013: 7.1 billion euros

Banca Transilvania's stock value was headed in 2007 toward 2 billion euros, but after drastic corrections on the financial markets, the bank reached a stock value of below 300 million euros in April 2009.

In December 2009, Bank of Cyprus acquired 9.7% of Banca Trasilvania's shares through several transactions made on Bucharest Stock Exchange totaling 58 million euros.

Banca Transilvania registered for Q1 of 2014, a net profit of 103.4 million lei, almost 23 million euros, having a  23% increase since last year's same period.

The BT Financial Group 

The BT Financial Group was formed in 2003, and includes Banca Transilvania, BT Asset Management, BT Direct, BT Leasing, BT Securities, Factoring company, BT Finop Leasing and Medicredit. BT has 100% equity shares or majority positions in  the other parts of the group, all of which use the BT logo.

BT Asset Management (BT AM) manages the group activities. It was founded in 2005 and manages the BT Maxim, BT Classic  and BT Invest 1 closed-end investment funds, which hold shares in Romanian companies with high growth potential. In 2007, BT Asset Management was the leading Romanian mutual fund with a market share of 15.3%, in 2008 it slipped to  5th place, with a market share of 5.2% and assets of 77.3 million RON.

Sponsorships 
As of 2021, it is the official jersey sponsor of the Romanian national basketball team, CS Universitatea Cluj-Napoca (men's basketball) and Romania national under-21 football team.

Notes

External links
Banca Transilvania

Banks of Romania
Companies based in Cluj-Napoca
Banks established in 1993
Romanian brands
Companies listed on the Bucharest Stock Exchange